Ricardo Núñez  (July 16, 1904 – June 16, 1998) was a Spanish actor, screenwriter, producer and film director. He starred in the 1934 comedy film World Crisis (1934).

Selected filmography

Actor
 The Rascal of Madrid (1926)
 Sister San Sulpicio (1927)
 The Mysteries of Tangier (1927)
 Football, Love, and Bullfighting (1929)
 The Cursed Village (1930)
 Nights in Port Said (1932)
 World Crisis (1934)
 Bound for Cairo (1935)

Producer
 The Songstress (1946)
 Song of Dolores (1947)

References

Bibliography 
 Bentley, Bernard. A Companion to Spanish Cinema. Boydell & Brewer 2008.

External links 
 

1904 births
1998 deaths
Spanish male film actors
Spanish male silent film actors
Spanish film directors
Spanish film producers
Spanish male writers
Male screenwriters
People from Betanzos
20th-century Spanish male actors
20th-century Spanish screenwriters
20th-century Spanish male writers